Juguang metro station is a station on the first phase of the Wanda–Zhonghe–Shulin line, as part of the Juguang Branch Line, located in Zhonghe, Taipei, Taiwan. This station is scheduled to open at the end of 2025.

Station overview 
The station is a two-level, underground station with one island platform. The design theme of the station will be based on “Harmony and Integration”, which aims to symbolise the relationship between human beings and cities, with the light walls of the station transforming imagery of plants into simple, abstract organic lines.

Station Layout

References 

Railway stations scheduled to open in 2025
Wanda–Zhonghe–Shulin line stations